"In the End" is a song by Northern Irish-Scottish alternative rock group Snow Patrol.  The track is the fourth single from the band's sixth studio album, Fallen Empires, it was released as a digital download on 13 February 2012.

Music video
A music video to accompany the release of "In the End" was first released onto YouTube on 13 January 2012 at a total length of four minutes and thirteen seconds. It shows a man and woman dancing in 1930s clothing while Gary serenades on a stage. The video was supposedly inspired by MGM musicals. The video was directed by Brett Simon.

Remixes
Two weeks after the music video release, UKF Dubstep, uploaded a Whateverman's remix of the original song on its YouTube channel.

Track listing

Charts

References

2011 singles
Snow Patrol songs
2011 songs
Songs written by Nathan Connolly
Songs written by Jacknife Lee
Songs written by Gary Lightbody
Songs written by Jonny Quinn
Songs written by Tom Simpson (musician)
Songs written by Paul Wilson (musician)
Polydor Records singles
Music videos directed by Brett Simon